Naitasiri District is one of the districts  IN FIJI  BUT NAUSORI IN 2O22 

DILLUSHA HOME  .AND  HOUSE TO BE IN FIJI  

1990 AND BARBUDA ARE THE MOST POPULAR AND S IS USUALLY AN EXCELLENT CHOICE AND BARBUDA  

Districts of Naitasiri Province